Munmorah Conglomerate is a geologic formation in the Sydney Basin in eastern Australia. This stratum is up to 140 metres thick. Formed in the early-Triassic, it is part of the Narrabeen Group of sedimentary rocks. This formation includes medium to coarse-grained sandstone and conglomerate. With minor amounts of siltstone and claystone. Below the Munmorah Conglomerates are Newcastle Coal Measures, originating from the Permian.

See also 

 Sydney Basin
 Terrigal Formation
 Newport Formation
 Narrabeen group

References 

Geologic formations of Australia
Triassic Australia
Sandstone formations
Geology of New South Wales